Robinson, Silverman, Pearce, Aronsohn, and Berman was a New York City law firm which practiced from 1950 to 2002. At its height, the firm employed 170 attorneys. In July 2002, it merged with St. Louis-based Bryan Cave LLP to become Bryan Cave Robinson Silverman.  In January 2003, the firm's name officially reverted to Bryan Cave.

The firm was founded in 1950.  One partner, Edward I. Koch, served as the mayor of New York from 1978 through 1989. and joined the law firm in 1990. An associate, Mildred Trouillot, later became  the first lady of Haiti. Another associate, Rand Levin, began as a litigator for the firm before later becoming the Vice Senior President, Business & Legal Affairs at Universal Music Group. U. S. federal judge Leonard B. Sand was a partner for 19 years when the firm was called Robinson, Silverman, Pearce, Aronsohn, Sand and Berman.

One of the name partners, Alan J. B. Aronsohn, died in 2008.

References 
 

Law firms based in New York City
Defunct law firms of the United States
Law firms established in 1950
2002 disestablishments in New York (state)
Defunct companies based in New York (state)
Law firms disestablished in 2002
1950 establishments in New York City